The 1970 Paris–Nice was the 28th edition of the Paris–Nice cycle race and was held from 8 March to 16 March 1970. The race started in Paris and finished in Nice. The race was won by Eddy Merckx of the Faemino–Faema team.

General classification

References

1970
1970 in road cycling
1970 in French sport
March 1970 sports events in Europe
1970 Super Prestige Pernod